One A.M. is the first studio album by American rapper Diverse. It was released on Chocolate Industries in 2003. The album features production by RJD2, Prefuse73, Madlib, and Jeff Parker. Guest appearances include Vast Aire, Lyrics Born, and Jean Grae.

Critical reception

Steve Huey of AllMusic gave the album 4 stars out of 5, calling it "[a] thoroughly excellent debut." He added, "Diverse's greatest strength as a rapper is his flow, as he spins a dense web of painstakingly constructed language over the beats as though he were spreading soft butter on toast."

Gabe Gloden of Stylus Magazine gave the album a grade of A−, stating: "There's not one dud to be found on One A.M., and at a lean 42 minutes, Diverse deserves at least that much of your time." Noel Dix of Exclaim! said: "Along with Vast Aire of Cannibal Ox and the mighty Jean Grae, there is simply far too much talent on this effort to go unnoticed."

Track listing

Personnel
Credits adapted from liner notes.

 Diverse – vocals, lyrics, mixing (12), arrangement (12)
 RJD2 – production (1–3, 7, 8), turntables (1, 2, 7), mixing (1, 2, 7, 8)
 Vast Aire – vocals (3), lyrics (3)
 DJ Precyse – turntables (3)
 Madlib – production (4)
 Prefuse 73 – production (5, 8, 10, 11), instrumentation (5, 11), backing vocals (5), mixing (5, 10, 11)
 K. Kruz – production (6)
 Lyrics Born – vocals (7), lyrics (7)
 Jean Grae – vocals (8), lyrics (8)
 Overflo – production (9), mixing (9)
 Jeff Parker – guitar (12), production (12)
 Ted Sirota – drums (12), production (12)
 R. Mazurek – horns (12)
 DJ Lok – additional production (12), recording (12)
 T. Foggi – recording, mixing (3, 4, 6, 12), arrangement (12)
 Mark Fellows – mastering
 Struggle Inc. – design
 B+ – photography

References

External links
 

2003 debut albums
Diverse (rapper) albums
Chocolate Industries albums
Albums produced by Madlib
Albums produced by RJD2